Draupadi Vastrapaharanam was a 1934 Tamil-language film starring T. P. Rajalakshmi, V. A. Chellappa and Serukulathur Sama. The movie was directed by R. Padmanaban.

Plot 

The film is based on the episode of the dice game and the disrobing of Draupadi in the Indian epic Mahabharatha.

Cast 
 T. P. Rajalakshmi as Draupadi
 V. A. Chellappa as Duryodhana
 M. D. Parthasarathy as Yudhishtra
 Serukulathur Sama as Krishna

References

External links
 

1934 films
1930s Tamil-language films
Films based on the Mahabharata
Indian black-and-white films